Þorgerður Ólafsdóttir  is an Icelandic visual artist. She was born in 1985 in Reykjavík and received Bachelor of Fine Arts from IUA in 2009. She graduated with Master of Fine Arts from the Glasgow School of Art in Scotland in 2013. She currently resides in Reykjavik, Iceland.

Work 
From 2014 - 2018 she was the Director of the Living Art Museum (NÝLÓ). In 2014 she established the biannual art project Staðir/Places in the Westfjords of Iceland, together with artist Eva Isleifsdóttir.

Artistic work 
In her practice she considers various objects and phenomena that are connected to our understanding of and relation to the natural world as it meets, overlaps, and is interpreted within human environments. Her recent work is centred around different manifestations of the Anthropocene and human time vs. geological time.

External links
  artist's homepage
  Staðir / Places

1985 births
Living people
Thorgerdur Olafsdottir
Thorgerdur Olafsdottir